Bristol Cathedral Choir School is a mixed gender non-selective musical Secondary Academy, located in the Cabot area of Bristol, England. Until 2008 it was known as Bristol Cathedral School. It is situated next to Bristol Cathedral, in the centre of the city. The choristers at Bristol Cathedral are educated at the school, which has a strong musical tradition. The school is a day school and has no boarders. The school admits some pupils each year based on musical aptitude, as well as admitting probationary choristers. That is the school's only form of selection, all other pupils are chosen at random via a lottery system.

History
Founded in 1140 as part of what was then Bristol Abbey, Bristol Cathedral School was refounded by Henry VIII in 1542 after he had dissolved the monastery.

A fee-paying school up until the Second World War, from 1944 to 1975 the school was a direct grant school. When direct grant schools were abolished, the school had to become an independent school once more to maintain its policy of selection by academic ability. It began accepting girls into the sixth form in 1982 and became fully co-educational in 2005.

In April 2007, the school appointed a new headmaster, Hugh Monro. In July of that year, the school moved towards ending a 30-year period as an independent, fee-paying institution by applying to change its status to a publicly funded city academy with specialities in music and maths – the first choir school in the country to make such a move. The formal agreement clearing the way for the school to become an academy in September 2008 was signed on 3 March 2008. The school also changed its name to Bristol Cathedral Choir School.

In January 2009, the school appointed a new headmaster, Neil Blundell.

External facilities 
Weekly assemblies, occasional services and school concerts are held in Bristol Cathedral.

The school has playing fields near Beggar Bush Lane in Failand. Games sessions for all years take place here, as well as forest school sessions for the primary school.

Future
The school site is undergoing a period of development. In 2008 the school completed a £3.5 million new building in College Square, and is currently building a new block, in an expansion of the School's facilities that will enable pupil numbers to grow from 400 to over 700.

In 2013, a primary school opened under the city library. It is known as Cathedral Primary School (CPS).

Buildings

The main school building is part of St Augustine's Abbey, which was founded in 1140. This contains the refectory and a 13th-century right-hand archway, with upper walls from the early 16th century. It was extensively altered and partly refaced in the late 18th and early 19th centuries. It has been designated by English Heritage as a grade II* listed building. The Abbey House and Deanery are also II* listed.

Newer buildings include the Cresswell Centre and the Parsonage, which was opened in 2008. These buildings are located on the west side of College Square.

Academic achievement
The school has improved its results over the period from 2009 to 2011 and achieved its best ever GCSE scores in 2011 The table below shows the percentage of students achieving the key measure of 5 GCSEs at grades A*-C including English Language and Mathematics.

Uganda link
Since 1987, Bristol Cathedral Choir School has been linked with St. James's School, an independent co-educational secondary school in the centre of Jinja, Uganda.
Each year a teacher from St. James's visits BCCS for two or three weeks, getting involved in School activities including expeditions, observing lessons and also giving lessons on topics such as AIDS, agriculture or African economics. In addition two gap year students from BCCS go to Jinja for six months each year. They act as classroom assistants at St. James's, as well as helping in a local primary school and in an orphanage or a street children's centre.

Notable Old Cathedralians

Sophie Anderton (born 1977), lingerie model and reality television personality
James Averis (born 1974), cricketer
Raymond L. Brett (1917–1996), university professor
 Julian Close of Red Box (born c.1960), musician and music industry professional
Chris Chivers (1967-), Anglican priest
Russ Conway (1925–2000), pianist and composer
Reginald Croom-Johnson (1879-1957)
Lieutenant-General Sir William Draper (1721–1787), army officer
John Fortune (1939-2013), comic and writer
Tom Dascombe (Born 1973), jockey and racehorse trainer
Racey Helps, (1913–1970), children's writer and illustrator
David Hulin, (born 1975), director and animation director
Andrew Ibrahim (born 1989), terrorist suspect convicted of preparing terrorist acts
Dan Jones (born 1969), composer
David Jones (1941–2010), Flavelle Medal–winning biologist
Chris McNab (born 1980), author and computer hacker
Mark Newman (born c.1967), physicist
Tom Spilsbury (born 1976), journalist, Doctor Who Magazine editor
Reece Winstone (1909–1991), photographer and local historian
Alan Geoffrey Woods (born 1942), Dean of Gibraltar 2003–2008

It has been alleged that the influential pseudonymous graffiti artist Banksy, whose identity is a closely guarded secret, is in fact a former pupil of Bristol Cathedral School named Robin Gunningham. Banksy himself has declined to either confirm or deny the allegation.

Former teachers
David Jewell, headmaster
Alastair Hignell, history and sport

See also
List of the oldest schools in the world

References

External links

Official school website

Old Boys website

Secondary schools in Bristol
Educational institutions established in the 12th century
Grade II* listed educational buildings
Grade II* listed churches in Bristol

1140 establishments in England
Bristol
Choir schools in England
Church of England secondary schools in the Diocese of Bristol
Academies in Bristol
Bristol Cathedral